Aristonicus or Aristonikos of Carystus was a  ball player (σφαιριστής) in Alexander the Great's entourage. He was granted Athenian citizenship as well as a statue due to his athletic prowess.

He is also mentioned in Suda.

References

Ancient Greek sportspeople
Courtiers of Alexander the Great
People from Karystos